The men's big air competition of the 2011 FIS Snowboarding World Championships was held in Barcelona, Spain on January 15, 2011. 52 athletes from 17 countries competed.

Results

Qualification
The following are the results of the qualification.

Final
In the final the best score of the first two rounds is paired with the score in the third run to sum up the total score. The second best score of the first two runs is then used as a tie-breaker.

References

Big air, men's